The Little Coliban River, a minor inland perennial river of the northcentral catchment, part of the Murray-Darling basin, is located in the lower Riverina bioregion and Central Highlands region of the Australian state of Victoria. The headwaters of the Little Coliban River rise on the northern slopes of the Great Dividing Range and descend to flow north into the Coliban River within the impounded Upper Coliban Reservoir.

Location and features
The river rises below Goodfellows Hill near  in the Great Dividing Range and flows generally north, before reaching its confluence with the Coliban River within the Upper Coliban Reservoir. The river descends  over its  course.

See also

References

External links

North-Central catchment
Rivers of Loddon Mallee (region)
Rivers of Grampians (region)
Central Highlands (Victoria)
Tributaries of the Murray River